Krasnojarsk was the first pallasite meteorite ever found.

History

In 1772, the unusual block was shown to Academician P.S.Pallas, who at that time was in those parts with an expedition.  On his instructions, the bulk of the lump, weighing about 40 pounds, was sent in 1773 to St. Petersburg, and in 1777 - delivered to the Kunstkamera.

Krasnojarsk was the first pallasite ever found and studied first time as meteorite in 1794 by Ernst Chladni, and led to the creation of the Pallasite group, named after Pallas.

It was also the first meteorite ever etched with acid (by G. Thomson) and therefore was the first one to show to human eyes the Widmanstätten pattern.

Composition and classification

It is a stony–iron meteorite of the Main Group Pallasite (MGP) group.

See also 
 Glossary of meteoritics
 Peter Simon Pallas
 G. Thomson
 Pallasite

References

External links 
 Meteoritical Bulletin Database

Meteorites found in Russia
Krasnoyarsk Krai
Stony-iron meteorites